Joshua James Rawlins (born 23 April 2004) is an Australian professional footballer who plays as a right back for Jong Utrecht.

Early life 
Born in Perth, Rawlins played for Dianella Soccer Club during his childhood, before joining Perth Glory's development sector in 2015.

He attended Our Lady's Assumption Primary School in Dianella, and then continued his study path at Chisholm Catholic College in Bedford.

Club career

Perth Glory 
After coming through the youth ranks of Perth Glory and playing both in the A-League Youth and the National Premier Leagues with their youth sides, Rawlins made his professional debut on 18 November 2020, starting the match against Shanghai Shenhua in the group stage of the 2020 AFC Champions League, which Perth eventually lost 1-2. In the occasion, he became the youngest player to ever feature in an ACL game, at 16 years, six months and 26 days. He would go on playing three more matches in the continental tournament, two of which as a starter, as his side finished last in their group and failed to progress to the next round.

On 20 January 2021, Rawlins made his debut in the A-League, starting the match against Adelaide United as his team eventually gained a 5-3 win: at 16 years and 272 days, he became the youngest ever player to feature in the starting XI for a league match. Under the manager Richard Garcia, he went on to collect eleven more appearances during the campaign (seven of which as a starter), as Perth finished the regular season at the bottom of the league table.

Finally, on 24 November 2021, the full-back debuted in the FFA Cup, coming in as a substitute for Tyler Vecchio at the 66th minute of the play-off match against Melbourne Victory, with the visitors eventually winning the match at penalty shoot-outs. During the 2021-2022 season, Rawlins established himself more as a regular starter in the team, collecting a total amount of 23 appearances between the league and the national cup, although Perth Glory finished last in the A-League and got left out of the final play-offs for the second year in a row.

Utrecht 
On 4 May 2022, it was officially announced that Rawlins would join Utrecht at the end of the season for an undisclosed fee, signing a four-year contract with the Dutch club and becoming their fifth ever Australian player in the process, after Tommy Oar, Adam Sarota, Michael Zullo and Daniel Arzani.

International career 
Rawlins has represented Australia at several youth international levels.

He was the captain of the national selection at the 2019 AFF U-15 Championship, where his side failed to progress to the knock-out stage.

In the same year, he was also included in the squad that took part in the FIFA Under-17 World Cup in Brazil: being the youngest player of the bunch, Rawlins played all of the three matches in the group stage of the competition, as the Joeys managed to progress to the knock-out phase as one of the best third-placed teams, before eventually getting eliminated by France in the round of 16.

In May 2022, Rawlins was called-up to the under-23 national team to take part in the AFC U-23 Asian Cup in Uzbekistan, once again being the youngest member in the squad. He subsequently made his debut for the Olyroos on June 4, starting their second group stage fixture against Iraq: in the occasion, he assisted Alou Kuol's opening goal, as the match eventually ended in a 1-1 draw. After losing to eventual champions Saudi Arabia in the semi-finals, Australia also lost the third place match against Japan and finished fourth overall in the continental tournament.

Style of play 
Whilst being mainly a right back, Rawlins can play in any position across the backline, as well as a defensive midfielder. He's been described as an athletic, quick and intelligent footballer, who has his biggest strengths in his passing and dribbling skills, while also doing good in the defensive phase of his game.

In 2021, the British newspaper The Guardian included him in their annual list of the most promising talents in world football, alongside his fellow countryman Mohamed Toure.

Career statistics

See also 

 List of Perth Glory FC players (25–99 appearances)

References

External links

2004 births
Living people
Australian soccer players
Australia youth international soccer players
Australia under-23 international soccer players
Association football defenders
Perth Glory FC players
Jong FC Utrecht players
National Premier Leagues players
A-League Men players
Eerste Divisie players
Australian expatriate soccer players
Expatriate footballers in the Netherlands
Australian expatriate sportspeople in the Netherlands